Annabelle Sreberny (born 5 September 1949 - 30 December 2022) was a writer, scholar, and professor of Global Media and Communication and Director of the Centre for Media and Film Studies at SOAS. Her writing covers globalization, communication, and culture with specific foci on international news and Iran.

Politics
Sreberny was a Labour Party member of the Islington North
Constituency Labour Party in Highbury East branch.

Authored books
The World of the News: The News of the World (University of Leicester, 1980)
Small Media, Big Revolution: Communication, Culture, and the Iranian Revolution with Ali Mohammadi (University of Minnesota Press, 1994)
Blogistan: The Internet and Politics in Iran with Gohlam Khiabany (I.B. Tauris, 2011)
Cultural Revolution in Iran: Contemporary Popular Culture in the Islamic Republic with Massoumeh Torfeh (I.B. Tauris, 2013)
Persian Service: the BBC and British Interests in Iran with Massoumeh Torfeh (I.B. Tauris, 2014)

Edited books
Questioning the Media: a Critical Introduction with John Downing; Ali Mohammadi (Sage Publications, 1995)
Media in Global Context : a Reader (Arnold, 1997)
Gender, Politics and Communication (Hampton Press, 2000)
International News in the 21st Century with Chris Patterson (John Libbey Publishing, 2004)
Media and Political Violence with Hillel Nossek, Prasun Sonwalkar (Hampton Press, 2007)

References

External links
Professor Annabelle Sreberny Faculty profile at SOAS

1949 births
Living people
Iranologists
English people of Jewish descent
Writers from London
Labour Party (UK) people
Academics of SOAS University of London